Valentina Fiorin (born 9 October 1984) is a retired Italian volleyball player. She was born in Dolo, Veneto.

In 1999 she started playing for the professional club Petrarca Sartori Padova. She played for Foppapedretti Bergamo.  She played for RC Cannes until 2010.

On 1 December 2011, Ageo Medics announced her joining.

References

External links
 FIVB Biography

1984 births
Living people
People from Dolo
Italian women's volleyball players
Ageo Medics players
Sportspeople from the Metropolitan City of Venice
21st-century Italian women